Michael Julian Drake (July 8, 1946 – September 21, 2011), Regent's Professor, was the Director of the University of Arizona's Lunar and Planetary Laboratory and Head of the Department of Planetary Sciences. He was the principal investigator of the Origins Spectral Interpretation Resource Identification Security Regolith Explorer (OSIRIS-REx) mission of NASA's New Frontiers Program. The OSIRIS-REx mission, launched on September 8, 2016 and scheduled to arrive at Asteroid Bennu in December 2018, is the most ambitious University of Arizona planetary science project to date and will retrieve a sample of the asteroid and return it to Earth. He also made significant contributions to the study of HED meteorites and studied the origin of water in terrestrial planets.

Education
Drake earned his B.S. degree in Geology with honors from Victoria University of Manchester in Manchester, England in 1967 and earned his Ph.D. in Geology from the University of Oregon in 1972.

Career
Drake joined the University of Arizona planetary sciences faculty as an assistant professor in 1973. He served as the associate director of the Lunar and Planetary Laboratory from 1978 through 1980 and was an associate professor of planetary sciences from 1978 through 1983.  In 1986 and 1987, he was the Associate Dean of Science, and in 1994 he became the head of the Department of Planetary Sciences and the Director of the Lunar and Planetary Laboratory in 1994. He served in that capacity until his death in 2011.

In addition to his academic and scientific achievements, Drake was an accomplished administrator. He helped develop promotion and tenure policies for the College of Science and was instrumental in establishing a joint position between the colleges of science and education to create science education programs. Drake also led a major undergraduate teaching effort in planetary sciences, even though the department was created as a graduate program.

Drake played a key role in a succession of ever many high-profile space projects that garnered international attention for LPL and the University. Those include the Cassini mission to explore Saturn, the Gamma-Ray Spectrometer onboard NASA's Mars Odyssey Orbiter, the HiRISE camera onboard NASA's Mars Reconnaissance Orbiter, and the Phoenix Mars Lander.

Drake had over 100 peer-reviewed scientific papers published in his career. He was fighting liver cancer in 2011 and died on September 21.

Awards and honors
Drake received a number of awards and honors during his career, including the College of Science Career Distinguished Teaching Award, Aviation Week and Space Technology 2001 Laurels Award for Outstanding Achievement in Space, Leonard Medal of the Meteoritical Society, and the University of Arizona Senior Honorary Bobcats Outstanding Faculty Member Award in 2006. Asteroid (9022) 1988 PC1 was named Drake in his honor by Carolyn S. Shoemaker.

References

External links
JPL Small-Body Database Browser on 9022 Drake

1946 births
2011 deaths
Planetary scientists
Alumni of the Victoria University of Manchester
University of Oregon alumni
University of Arizona people
Presidents of the Geochemical Society